The Atlantic flyingfish (Cheilopogon melanurus) is a flying fish in the family Exocoetidae. It was first described by the French zoologist, Achille Valenciennes in a 22-volume work entitled Histoire naturelle des poissons (Natural History of Fish), which was a collaboration with fellow zoologist Georges Cuvier.

Description

Like many other flyingfishes, the Atlantic flyingfish has a cylindrical body and large tail and pectoral fins that it uses for flight. To fly, the Atlantic flyingfish jumps out of the water, uses its pectoral fins to catch air currents and provide lift, and beats its tail back and forth to provide thrust. Atlantic flyingfish are generally green to blue dorsally, and white or silver ventrally. This is presumably done to avoid ocean-going predators.

Distribution and habitat
As its name suggests, the Atlantic flyingfish is only found in the pelagic zone to the neritic zone in the Atlantic Ocean. In the western Atlantic, they are known to live in Gulf Stream waters from Massachusetts south to Brazil. They are found in the Caribbean Sea and around the Antilles, while in the north, they are found off the coast of Canada.<ref
 name = scott>Scott, W.B. and M.G. Scott 1988 Atlantic fishes of Canada. Can. Bull. Fish. Aquat. Sci. 219: 731 p</ref> Off Africa, Atlantic flyingfish are known from Senegal to Liberia, and have been reported from São Tomé and Príncipe. They are found in surface waters near shore, where Atlantic flyingfish are preyed upon by several species of larger fishes and seabirds, such as the Wahoo and Sooty tern.

Gallery

References

External links

Fishbase.org
Discoverlife.org
ITIS.gov
Animalexploration.tripod.org

Atlantic flyingfish
Fish described in 1847